Robert Heinrich Viktor Stumpfl (4 June 1904 – 11 August 1937) was an Austrian philologist who specialized in Germanic studies and the history of theatre.

Biography
Robert Stumpfl was born in Vienna, Austria-Hungary on 6 June 1904. His father was a senior official in the Foreign Ministry of Austria-Hungary. He studied English,  German and Scandinavian at the universities of Vienna and Kiel, gaining his Ph.D. at Vienna in 1926 under the supervision of Rudolf Much. His dissertation was on Protestant theatre in Austria during the Reformation (16th century). In the 1920s the prospects for an academic career in Austria were dim, and Stumpfl subsequently lectured in German at the University of Edinburgh.

Returning to Austria Stumpfl married Johanna Nikolaia Karoline Spitzy in Vienna on 7 July 1931. He completed his habilitation at the University of Berlin in 1936 under the supervision of Julius Petersen. His thesis for the habilitation, Kultspiele der Germanen als Ursprung des mittelalterlichen Dramas (1936), suggested strong Germanic influences on the emergence on medieval theatre and diverged from the then-standard notion that drama had evolved out of the Christian liturgy. The Germanic line of research had earlier been pursued by Jacob Grimm and Gustav Freytag. Stumpfl was a professor at the University of Heidelberg.

See also
 Richard Wolfram
 Walter Steinhauser
 Siegfried Gutenbrunner

Selected works
 Schauspielmasken des Mittelalters und der Renaissancezeit und ihr Fortbestehen im Volksschauspiel, 1931
 Das alte Schultheater in Steyr im Zeitalter der Reformation und Gegenreformation, 1933
 Unser kampf um ein deutsches nationaltheater, 1935
 Kultspiele der Germanen als Ursprung des mittelalterlichen Dramas, 1936

Sources

 

1904 births
1937 deaths
Austrian non-fiction writers
Austrian philologists
Germanists
Germanic studies scholars
Road incident deaths in Austria
University of Vienna alumni
Academic staff of Heidelberg University
20th-century philologists